Liricas Analas is a rap crew from the canton of Grisons, G R . Switzerland. Their first album, Analogia, is the first rap album in the Romansh language. Author and anthropologist Pascal Hofmeier notes that in choosing to rap in Romansh, a language spoken by only a few thousand people, yet instantly identifiable as Swiss, Liricas Analas takes the concept of Lokalpatriotismus (local pride), which is so prevalent in the Swiss hip-hop scene, to an extreme level. Their 2006 CD, AnalFaBad, contained the chart-topping song "Siemis".

Members 
 Pius aka pddp
 Just
 Flepp
 Orange aka Pumaranza 
 Spoon
 DJ Gionson
 DJ Suit

Discography 
 Analogia (2004)
 AnalFaBad (2006)
 Analectrica (2009)
 Analium (2012)
 Banalitad (2016)
 LIRICAS ANALAS (2022)

References

External links 
 Liricas Analas homepage

Swiss hip hop groups
Romansh language
Culture of Graubünden